Saaphyri Windsor (born Wanda Scott) is an American reality television contestant. Windsor is best known for appearing on Flavor of Love 2 and winning Flavor of Love Girls: Charm School. After the show, Windsor launched a unisex lip balm called Saaphyri's Lip Chap which stemmed from Saaphyri offering H-Town "lip chap" after their fight on Flavor of Love 2.

Career
In 2006, Saaphyri participated in the second season of Flavor of Love. Shortly after entering the house, Saaphyri and H-Town were involved in an altercation when Saaphryi felt H-Town stole the bed Saaphyri had claimed for herself. Flavor Flav listened to both sides of the story regarding the fight and reviewed the tapes containing footage of the fight. He ultimately decided that Windsor initiated the fight and eliminated her from the competition.

After her appearance on Flavor of Love, Saaphyri participated in Flavor of Love Girls: Charm School. The show featured thirteen of the Flavor of Love girls competing for a $50,000 prize. Saaphyri was the winner of that competition. and as a final gift, Mo'Nique brought out her sentimental UGG boots (which Saaphyri had selflessly sold during a challenge), reminding Saaphyri of Mo'Nique's promise that she would get them back.

Saaphyri appeared in Flavor of Love 3 to help judge a competition involving entrepreneurship.

Saaphyri came in fifth place on the second season of the VH1 reality show I Love Money. She was automatically eliminated in Episode 14, the season finale, after placing last in a challenge and becoming "the dead-last loser" (she placed last in the challenge.) Saaphyri appeared in all the Episodes of I Love Money 2 except for the Reunion special (due to her legal issues).

Legal issues
In January 2009, Saaphyri was sentenced to three years in prison after failing to show up for a November 2005 court date.<ref name=jail/. She served 20 months, and was released in August 2010.

Television appearances

Filmography

Award nominations

References

External links
 
 

Living people
Participants in American reality television series
African-American actresses
African-American female models
American female models
African-American models
American film actresses
American people of Ethiopian descent
American television actresses
Reality show winners
Actresses from Los Angeles
1979 births
Flavor of Love
21st-century African-American people
21st-century African-American women
20th-century African-American people
20th-century African-American women